Antoine Deflotrière (11 August 1876 – 14 May 1934) was a French racing cyclist active in the early 1900s. He finished in last place in the 1904 Tour de France.

References

External links
 

1876 births
1934 deaths
French male cyclists
People from Tarare
Sportspeople from Rhône (department)
Cyclists from Auvergne-Rhône-Alpes